Le due duchesse or La caccia dei lupi is a semiseria opera in two acts by Johann Simon Mayr to a libretto by Felice Romani which was premiered 7 November 1814 at La Scala in Milan and revived in 1819 at the Teatro San Carlo, Naples. Romani used his libretto again with a few changes for a new setting by Filippo Celli (1782–1856) for Florence on 8 September 1824.

Recordings
 Jaegyeong Jo (bass), Anna Feith (soprano), Samuel Hasselhorn (baritone), Niklas Mallmann (bass), Tina Marie Herbert (soprano), Eun-Hye Choi (soprano), Markus Schäfer (tenor), Young-Jun Ahn (tenor), Jörn Lindemann (tenor), Harald Thum (tenor), Andreas Mattersberger (bass) Concerto de Bassus, Bayerischer Staatsopernchor, Simon Mayr Chorus Franz Hauk

References

Operas
1814 operas
Operas by Simon Mayr
Italian-language operas